Echinodontium tinctorium is a species of fungus in the family Echinodontiaceae. A plant pathogen, it is commonly known as the Indian paint fungus. Found on tree species such as grand fir (and indicating a rotten core), it can be identified by the grayish spines of its lower surface.

Native Americans used the red interior as a pigment. Some Plateau Indian tribes applied the fungus to skin to prevent it from chapping. It is inedible.

References

External links
 Roger's Mushrooms

Fungi described in 1895
Fungal plant pathogens and diseases
Inedible fungi
Russulales